Acourtia wrightii, common name brownfoot, is a North American species of plant in the family Asteraceae. It is native to the southwestern United States (Texas, New Mexico, Arizona, southern Utah, southern Nevada) and northern Mexico (Chihuahua, Coahuila, Durango, Nuevo León, San Luis Potosí, Sonora, Zacatecas).

It is used by the Kayenta Navajo for difficult labor and as a postpartum medicine. The Hualapai also use it medicinally; in that they apply a poultice of the woolly "cotton" from the plant to open, bleeding wounds, and the Pima use it as a styptic.

References

Flora of the South-Central United States
Nassauvieae
Plants used in traditional Native American medicine
Plants described in 1852
Flora of Arizona
Flora of Utah
Flora of Northeastern Mexico
Flora of Sonora